Lily Ann Zhang (born June 16, 1996) is an American table tennis player who competed in the 2012 Summer Olympics in London with teammates Ariel Hsing and Erica Wu. She also competed in the 2016 Summer Olympics in Rio with teammates Jiaqi Zheng and Jennifer Wu. She is a five time US national champion in women's singles. Zhang has won the US national championship in 2012, 2014, 2016, 2017, and 2019. In 2011, she was a bronze medalist in women's singles and women's team at the Pan American Games and won the women's doubles title at the Qatar Peace and Sport Cup. She is currently a member of the United States National Women's team. She has been ranked as high as #2 in the cadet (U-15) world ranking and #5 in the junior (U-18) world ranking.

Personal life
Lily Zhang was born in Redwood City, California on June 16, 1996, to Chinese parents. Her family lived on the campus of Stanford University, where her father was then a mathematics professor. Her mother played for her province's table tennis team in Xi'an, China, and Lily enjoyed playing table tennis with her parents while she was growing up. Dennis Davis, a friend and table tennis colleague of her father, would also bring her to the Palo Alto Table Tennis Club to practice. Lily graduated from Palo Alto High School in 2014 before enrolling in the University of California, Berkeley. After her first year, Lily took a gap year off to train for the 2016 Olympic Games. For a part of her gap year, she trained and played league in Austria (trained at home club ICC as well).

Lily is featured in the documentary Top Spin.

Lily is sponsored by JOOLA Table Tennis.

U.S. career
From a young age, Lily Zhang showed promising skill. When she was 7 years old, Dennis Davis, the president and head coach of the Palo Alto Table Tennis Club and the North American representative of the junior commission of International Table Tennis Federation, began training her. When she was 11, Zhang made the U.S. Cadet Team. By age 12, Zhang became the youngest player to ever make the U.S. Women's Team, and when she was 13 years old, she was the #2 ranked Junior Woman table tennis player in the United States.

At the 2010 and 2011 U.S. National Championships, Zhang won the title in the junior girls' event and was the runner-up in women's singles. In 2012, she won her first national championship in women's singles, beating defending champion Ariel Hsing in 7 games.

International career
Since 2007, Zhang has competed in numerous international events in the cadet, junior girls' and women's categories.

2011 Pan American Games
Zhang and the two other Americans on the team, Ariel Hsing and Erica Wu, took home a team bronze medal. She also won a bronze medal in women's singles.

Qatar Peace and Sport Cup
On November 22, 2011, Lily Zhang and Russian Anna Tikhomirova won the Women's Doubles title at the Qatar Peace and Sport Cup.

2012 Olympics
After qualifying for the last singles position on the 2012 United States Olympic Team by beating Canada's Anqi Luo in five games in the North American Olympic Trials, Lily Zhang would head into London as the youngest player of the table tennis competition and was seeded 49th behind her teammate Ariel Hsing. In the first round, Zhang drew Croatian veteran Cornelia Molnar and lost in straight games (11–6,11–8,11–7,11–5).

The team competition saw the United States play second-seeded Japan in the first round of proceedings. Zhang lost to Sayaka Hirano in straight games (11–9,11–5,11–3) and teamed with Erica Wu in the doubles to lose to Kasumi Ishikawa and Ai Fukuhara, also in straight games (11–7,11–7,11–1).

2012 North American Championships
On September 2, 2012, Zhang won the women's singles title at the ITTF North American Championships with a victory over fellow 2012 Olympian Erica Wu in straight games (11–8,11–3,11–7,11–9). Twice before, at both the 2011 and the 2010 North American Championships she had failed to achieve the title, with losses in the finals on both occasions to Canada's Zhang Mo.

2012 World Junior Championships
At the 2012 ITTF World Junior Championships in Hyderabad, India, Lily Zhang reached the quarterfinals in singles and also led the USA into the quarterfinals of the team competition. As a result of her performance during the championships (12 wins, 2 losses), Zhang broke into the top 100 of the ITTF women's world ranking for the first time in her career.

2013 US Open
At the 2013 US Open, Zhang won the title in the junior girls' event. In women's singles (part of the ITTF World Tour), she beat Zhang Mo to advance to the semi-final, where she lost to world #19 Elizabeta Samara in 5 games. Following this tournament, Zhang's world ranking improved to a career-high 84.

2014 Youth Olympic Games
In August 2014, Lily Zhang was the first ever US athlete to win a bronze medal in the 2014 Summer Youth Olympics. In the contest for bronze, she won over Miyu Kato of Japan in six games.

2019 ITTF Women's World Cup
She was in fourth place, losing in the POS 3–4 to Feng Tianwei. Zhang's performance included a high-profile upset over Miu Hirano.

2020 ITTF Women's World Cup
Zhang extended her World Cup success in 2020 with an upset over Feng Tianwei.

2021
At the Tokyo Olympics, after receiving a brief scare and dropping the first game in her opening round of 64 match against Nigeria's Offiong Edem, Zhang was able to quickly regroup and adjust to cruise to a 4–1 victory.

References

External links

1996 births
Living people
Palo Alto High School alumni
American female table tennis players
Olympic table tennis players of the United States
Table tennis players at the 2012 Summer Olympics
Table tennis players at the 2016 Summer Olympics
Table tennis players at the 2020 Summer Olympics
Table tennis players at the 2014 Summer Youth Olympics
Pan American Games bronze medalists for the United States
Pan American Games medalists in table tennis
American sportswomen
American sportspeople of Chinese descent
People from Redwood City, California
Sportspeople from the San Francisco Bay Area
Table tennis players at the 2011 Pan American Games
Table tennis players at the 2015 Pan American Games
Table tennis players at the 2019 Pan American Games
Medalists at the 2011 Pan American Games
Medalists at the 2015 Pan American Games
Medalists at the 2019 Pan American Games
21st-century American women
World Table Tennis Championships medalists